Asika or Aska is a town and a Notified Area Council in Ganjam district in the state of Odisha, India. Fondly known as the Sugar city of Odisha. Asika is a major commercial and transportation hub of Ganjam district.

Geography
It has an average elevation of 30 metres (98 feet). It is situated at a distance of 40 km from Brahmapur on South, 35 km from Bhanjanagar on the North at the confluence of Rivers Rushikulya and Badanadi (Bara River).

Asika Sugar Factory
Asika Sugar Factory is the first sugar factory in Asia, established in 1824. The plant is located in Asika town. Asika Cooperative Sugar Industries is a large scale industry employing more than 35000 families.

It is one of the oldest in India, built by Minchin Saheb in British time. Along with the factory at Nellikuppam near Cuddalore, it was managed by Parry and Co. Due to this factory Asika Town is known as Sugar City.

The jaggery mill was started in 1848 as Asika Sugar Works and Distillery Ltd. by Parry and Co. Madras. It met with huge losses for lack of supervision and other transport bottlenecks. Thereafter, Fredrick Josheph Vivian Minchin, the Book Keeper of Biny & Co. purchased the factory and with the new Sugar Technology obtained from Germany designed and rebuilt the factory in 1856.

Demographics
As of the 2011 Census of India, Asika had a population of 21,428 (third largest city in terms of population  Ganjam dist after Brahmapur and Hinjilicut). Males constitute 52% of the population and females 48%. Asika has an average literacy rate of 85.76%, higher than the national average of 72.87%; with 56% of the males and 44% of females literate. 12% of the population is under 6 years of age.

History

Temples
Satyanarayan Temple, Binayak Bazar, Aska
 Maa Fulakasuni (Odia sahi)
Rameshwar Temple, KS Patna
 Maa Khambeswari Goddess
 Jagannath Temple (Sunambo Sahi)
 Panchamuki Hanuman Mandir
 Jaganatha Temple (Nuagam)
 Kali Mandir (Nuagam)
 Bhagabat Mandir (Nuagam)
 Radha Krushna Mandir (Nuagam)
 Ram Mandir (Nuagam)
 Pudageswar 
 Subarneswar
 Nilakantheswar 
 Satyanarayan
 Karanjei Goddess
 Balunkeswar 
 Tirupati Balaji
 Ram Mandir
 Hanuman Mandir
 Maa Kali 
 Maa Kalimukhi
 Narshinha
 Maa Thakurani near Gondopuli
 Jaganath temple main road Kalasanadh Pur
 Hunuman temple main road Kalasanadh Pur
 Radha Krishna Temple (Banibihar, Aska)
 Sai Mandira
 Maa Kankana Devi temple, (Bhetanai)
 Ellama Potturaj (Damodarpalli)
 Maa Rajjamma Kanekamma (Dhobapalli)
 Hanuman Temple (Kotibadi)
 Gopinath Temple (Raipalli)
 Radhakrishna Mandir
(Chadhiapalli)

Climate and regional setting
Maximum summer temperature is 34 °C; minimum winter temperature is 23 °C. The mean daily temperature varies from 33 °C to 38 °C. May is the hottest month; December is the coldest. The average annual rainfall is 1250 mm and the region receives monsoon and torrential rainfall from July to October.

Education

Schools
 Harihar High School
 A.S.I High School Nuagam
 Kendriya Vidyalaya 
 Saraswati Shishu Vidya Mandir
 NAC High School
 Mac Mickle Sanskrit Vidyalaya
 Hari Har High School
 Harihar Nagar UP School
 Bediri Sahi UP School
 Govt Tech High School
 Govt Girls High School
 Aryan Public School
 DePaul School
 Mom School of Excellency
 SriAurobindo Integral Education Center, R.Damodar Palli
 Technical High School
 Utkal Public School, Kishore Chandra Palli
 Ramakrushna adarsha vidya mandir, Gayatri nagar, aska

College
Aska Science College
 Niranjan Women's College
 Mac Mickle Sanskrit College
 Saraswati Vidya (junior) Mandir College

Banks
 SBI Main Branch
 Asika Coperative Bank
 SBI ADB Branch
 Andhra Bank
 Axis bank
 ICICI Bank
 Bank Of India
 Utkal Grameen Bank
 Union Bank of India
 Indian Overseas Bank
 Karur Vaiysa bank
 Punjab National Bank
 HDFC bank
 Corporation Bank of India
 SBI Sme Branch

Transport

Road
Asika is connected with National Highway 59 (India) (Khariar – Brahmapur) and National Highway 157 (India) (Purunakatak – Asika) which connect Asika to other cities and towns of Odisha.

Rail
 Brahmapur railway station

Air
 Biju Patnaik International Airport
 Berhampur Airport

Port
 Gopalpur port

Politics
Aska (Vidhan Sabha constituency) includes Asika N.A.C, Asika block and 12 GPs (Subalaya, Kaniari, Barida, Paikajamuna, Sunapalli, Sialia, Nandiagada, Borasingi, Ambapua, Baliasara, Bolasara and Sunarijhola) of Kabisuryanagar block. The current MLA from Asika Assembly Constituency is Smt. Manjula Swain of BJD. Previous MLAs from this seat was Sri. Debaraj Mohanty from 2004 to 2014 of BJD, Usharani Panda of the Indian National Congress in 1995, Duti Krushna Panda of CPI in 1990, Raghaba Parida who won representing INC in 1985 and as a candidate of the Indian National Congress in 1980, and Harihar Swain of JNP in 1977.

Asika is part of Aska (Lok Sabha constituency).

References

Cities and towns in Ganjam district